Bevan Christopher George  (born 22 March 1977 in Narrogin, Western Australia) is a field hockey defender from Australia.

Field hockey

National team
George won a gold medal with the Australia national field hockey team (The Kookaburras) at the 2004 Summer Olympics in Athens, and captained The Kookaburras at the 2008 Summer Olympics, where they won a bronze medal.  George retired from international competition after the Beijing Games, having played 208 games for Australia. In the 2005 Australia Day Honours George was awarded the Medal of the Order of Australia (OAM).

He was also part of the Australian Junior Team that won the golden medal at the Junior World Cup in Milton Keynes, 1997. George, nicknamed Jethro, played his 100th match for The Kookaburras on 23 May 2004 against Belgium during the European Tour. He was the captain of the team that won the Champions Trophy in December 2005 in Chennai, where he was named Player of the Tournament, as well as captain.

He is a fullback.

In 1999, he had a scholarship with and played for the Australian Institute of Sport team.

He competed in the 2007 Champions Trophy competition for Australia.

After winning a medal at the 2008 Summer Olympics, he retired from the sport.

In December 2011, he was named as one of fourteen players to be on the 2012 Summer Olympics Australian men's national Olympic development squad.  While this squad is not in the top twenty-eight and separate from the Olympic training coach, the Australian coach Ric Charlesworth did not rule out selecting from only the training squad, with players from the Olympic development having a chance at possibly being called up to represent Australia at the Olympics.  He trained with the team from 18 January to mid-March in Perth, Western Australia.

International tournaments
 2000 - Champions Trophy, Amstelveen (5th place)
 2001 - Champions Trophy, Rotterdam (2nd place)
 2002 - World Cup, Kuala Lumpur (2nd place)
 2002 - Commonwealth Games, Manchester (1st place)
 2002 - Champions Trophy, Cologne (5th place)
 2003 - Champions Trophy, Amstelveen (2nd place)
 2004 - Olympic Games, Athens (1st place)
 2005 - Champions Trophy, Chennai (1st place)
 2006 - Commonwealth Games, Melbourne (1st place)
 2006 - Champions Trophy, Terrassa (4th place)
 2006 - World Cup, Mönchengladbach (2nd place)
 2007 - Champions Trophy, Kuala Lumpur (2nd place)
 2008 - Olympic Games, Beijing (3rd place)

References

External links
 

1977 births
Living people
Australian male field hockey players
Olympic field hockey players of Australia
Male field hockey defenders
Field hockey players at the 2002 Commonwealth Games
2002 Men's Hockey World Cup players
Field hockey players at the 2004 Summer Olympics
Field hockey players at the 2006 Commonwealth Games
2006 Men's Hockey World Cup players
Field hockey players at the 2008 Summer Olympics
Olympic gold medalists for Australia
Olympic bronze medalists for Australia
Commonwealth Games gold medallists for Australia
Olympic medalists in field hockey
People from Narrogin, Western Australia
Field hockey people from Western Australia
Medalists at the 2008 Summer Olympics
Medalists at the 2004 Summer Olympics
Commonwealth Games medallists in field hockey
Recipients of the Medal of the Order of Australia
Medallists at the 2002 Commonwealth Games
Medallists at the 2006 Commonwealth Games